Acadiensis: Journal of the History of the Atlantic Region (fr: Acadiensis: Revue d'histoire de la région Atlantique) is a semi-annual peer-reviewed academic journal covering the history of Atlantic Canada. The current editors-in-chief are Erin Morton (University of New Brunswick) and Peter Twohig (St Mary's University). It is published by the Department of History at the University of New Brunswick, with articles in either English or French. The name Acadiensis originated with an earlier periodical with the same name, a general interest quarterly magazine for the Maritime provinces, with an emphasis on local history. It was published in Saint John, New Brunswick by David Russell Jack from 1901 to 1908 but failed due to insufficient financial support.

Acadiensis was awarded the Clio Prize of the Canadian Historical Association in 1979 for its promotion of regional history. The journal has sponsored the biennial Atlantic Canada Studies Conference since 1974 and awards an annual David Alexander Prize for the best undergraduate essay on Atlantic Canada history. A weekly blog, edited by Corey Slumkoski (Mount Saint Vincent University), publishes current commentaries. A related organization, Acadiensis Press, was established in 1980 to publish books, mainly scholarly editions of documents and thematic collections of essays.

Longterm citation data for Acadiensis reported by Scopus in 2017 rated the journal in the 68th percentile and ranked it 303 in a list of 983 history journals.

Abstracting and indexing
The journal offers access to its own indexes. It is also indexed and/or abstracted or aggregated in the following bibliographic databases:

References

Further reading
  A retrospective presentation on the journal. Also published as 
 A special issue on the development of Atlantic Canada studies from the 1970s to 2000s, including the impact of Acadiensis.

External links
 
 Selected volumes of the early Acadiensis (1901–08) are available at archive.org. An index to this earlier periodical was published as 

Mass media in New Brunswick

Publications established in 1901
Publications disestablished in 1908
Publications established in 1971
Multilingual journals
Biannual journals
University of New Brunswick
History journals
1901 establishments in Canada
1908 disestablishments in Canada
1971 establishments in Canada
English-language journals
French-language journals
Academic journals published by universities and colleges